George John may refer to:

 George John (cricketer) (c. 1883–1944), West Indian fast bowler
 George John (soccer) (born 1987), American soccer player
 Georg John (1879–1941), German stage and film actor
 George John I, Count Palatine of Veldenz (1543–1592)
 George John II, Count Palatine of Lützelstein-Guttenberg (1586–1654)

See also
 George St. John (1878–1934), Australian rules footballer
 George Sibley Johns (1857–1941), American journalist
 John George (disambiguation)